The 1910 Campeonato Paulista, organized by the LPF (Liga Paulista de Football), was the 9th season of São Paulo's top association football league. AA das Palmeiras won the title for the 2nd time. No teams were relegated and the top scorers were AA das Palmeiras's Eurico, Paulistano's Rubens Salles and São Paulo Athletic's Herbert Boyes with 10 goals.

System
The championship was disputed in a double-round robin system, with the team with the most points winning the title.

Championship

Qualifying tournament

Championship

References

Campeonato Paulista seasons
Paulista